Hardy Fabián Cavero Vargas (born 31 May 1996) is a Chilean footballer who plays for Universidad de Concepción of the Primera B de Chile as a defender.

Personal life
Cavero is of Mapuche descent.

References

External links
 
 

1996 births
Living people
People from Puerto Montt
Chilean people of Mapuche descent
Chilean footballers
Chile under-20 international footballers
Colo-Colo footballers
Colo-Colo B footballers
San Marcos de Arica footballers
C.D. Antofagasta footballers
A.C. Barnechea footballers
Universidad de Concepción footballers
Chilean Primera División players
Segunda División Profesional de Chile players
Primera B de Chile players
Association football defenders
Mapuche sportspeople
Indigenous sportspeople of the Americas